Anatoli Aleksandrovich Grishin (born 5 September 1986) is a Russian former professional football player.

Club career
He played in the Russian Football National League for FC Metallurg Krasnoyarsk in 2006.

External links
 
 

1986 births
Living people
Russian footballers
Association football midfielders
FC Yenisey Krasnoyarsk players
FC Amur Blagoveshchensk players